The National Trades Union Congress (NTUC), also known as the Singapore National Trades Union Congress (SNTUC) internationally, is the sole national trade union centre in Singapore. NTUC is at the heart of the Labour Movement which comprises 59 affiliated trade unions, 5 affiliated trade associations, 10 social enterprises, 6 related organisations as well as a growing ecosystem of U Associates and enterprise partners. Together, it helms May Day celebrations and organises an annual rally in support of workers' solidarity and commitment to tripartite partnership. The NTUC has had a symbiotic relationship with the People's Action Party (PAP) since its inception in 1961.

History
The NTUC was established in 1961 when the Singapore Trades Union Congress (STUC), which had backed the People's Action Party (PAP) in its successful drive for self-government, split into the pro-PAP NTUC and the leftist Singapore Association of Trade Unions (SATU). The SATU collapsed in 1963, following the government's detention of its leaders during Operation Coldstore and its subsequent official deregistration on 13 November 1963, leaving the NTUC as the sole trade union centre. Currently, over 98% of union members are in unions affiliated with the NTUC.

After the PAP's decisive electoral victory in 1968, the government passed the Industrial Relations (Amendment) Act of 1968, which severely limited workers rights to engage in either direct collective bargaining with employers, industrial action or strike action. From 1969, the NTUC adopted, in its own words, "a cooperative, rather than a confrontational policy towards employers".

Relations between the PAP and NTUC are very close, and have often resulted in members holding office in both organisations at the same time. The NTUC's late founder, Devan Nair, was a PAP stalwart and later served as President of Singapore. Ong Teng Cheong, the first directly elected President of Singapore, served as the secretary-general of NTUC, and the country's deputy prime minister, concurrently until his presidential election. Lim Boon Heng and Lim Swee Say, the previous secretaries-general, also became Cabinet ministers. As of 4 May 2015, Chan Chun Sing took over as Secretary-General from Lim Swee Say, who left the NTUC to become Minister for Manpower (with effect from the same date). As of 22 May 2018, Ng Chee Meng took over as Secretary-General from Chan Chun Sing, who left NTUC to become Minister of Trade and Industry.

It was announced by NTUC that from January 2021, a new insurance scheme would be introduced to cover migrant workers against critical illnesses, non-work related deaths, with the employers needing to pay premiums of $9 a year per worker.

The NTUC reached its target of 1 million members in 2021.

Trade unions in Singapore
Trade unions in Singapore are run along democratic lines, and membership is voluntary.  Major decisions on industrial actions are taken only with majority support expressed through secret ballot.

There are three tiers of union leadership, all elected via secret ballot. Workers in a company elect their branch leaders. The next layer is the executive committee of a union. Officials from the executive committee are drawn from the branches. At the national level, there is the Central Committee of the NTUC. The 21-member Central Committee is elected every four years.

Union leaders and employers serve on key institutions such as the National Wages Council, the Economic Development Board, the Central Provident Fund and the Singapore Productivity and Standards Board.  Government and employer representatives also serve on the boards of the cooperatives, business ventures and other organisations controlled by the NTUC.

NTUC Central Committee
At the national level, once every four years, the union delegates elect a 21-member NTUC Central Committee to oversee the work of the labour movement. The Central Committee members will then elect: President, Secretary-General, Secretary for Financial Affairs (Treasurer) and vice-presidents among themselves. Thereafter, the Central Committee will appoint other principal officeholders.

Union leadership includes Members of Parliament (MPs) from the People's Action Party (PAP), as part of a symbiotic between the PAP and NTUC. MPs who are part of the NTUC are called "labour MPs", not to be confused with the Labour Party MPs in the United Kingdom.

These MPs are subject to elections, just as the other grassroots unionists are. Many other MPs, including Cabinet ministers, serve as union advisors.

NTUC Executive Committee
At union headquarters level, key branch officials represent their branches at Union Headquarters as delegates. They have a right to vote or stand as candidates in elections to the Union Executive Committee which is responsible for the effective operation of the union.

Affiliated unions are represented at the NTUC Delegates Conference, the supreme authority of the labour movement. The Delegates Conference is held once in two years. During this conference, delegates review the work of the NTUC and map out future directions for the labour movement.

Union membership

In April 2016, the total Union Membership figure in Singapore was 900,000. There are two main groups of members: Ordinary Branch (OB) members are directly represented by the unions/affiliates and enjoy direct collective bargaining rights, while General Branch (GB) members, who work in non-unionised companies, cannot be represented directly but are given workplace advice and whose employment issues are still handled professionally. NTUC also works with social enterprises (see below) to provide a range of core and lifestyle benefits for all of its members.

Since 2002, executives are also permitted to join the NTUC membership base, which was traditionally composed of rank-and-file employees. Apart from lifestyle benefits, they also enjoy some representation (if they are employed in unionised companies).

NTUC Affiliated Unions and Associations 
59 Trade Unions and 3 Trade Associations are affiliated to the National Trades Union Congress. The affiliated unions can be broadly categorised under Industrial Sector, Service Sector, Public Sector Unions and Omnibus Unions.

Industrial Sector Unions 
 Building Construction And Timber Industries Employees' Union (BATU)
 Chemical Industries Employees' Union (CIEU)
 ExxonMobil Singapore Employees Union (EMSEU)
 Keppel Employees Union (KEU)
 Keppel FELS Employees' Union (KFEU)
 Advanced Manufacturing Employees' Union (AMEU)
 NatSteel Employees' Union (NEU)
 Shipbuilding and Marine Engineering Employees' Union (SMEEU)
 Singapore Refining Company Employees' Union (SRCEU)
 Sembawang Shipyard Employees' Union (SSEU-Sembawang)
 Singapore Shell Employees' Union (SSEU-Shell)
 United Workers of Electronics & Electrical Industries (UWEEI)
 United Workers of Petroleum Industry (UWPI)

Service Sector Unions 
 Air Transport Executive Staff Union (AESU)
 Attractions, Resorts & Entertainment Union (AREU)
 Creative Media and Publishing Union (CMPU)
 DBS Staff Union (DBSSU)
 dnata Singapore Staff Union (DSSU)
 Education Services Union (ESU)
 Food Drinks and Allied Workers Union (FDAWU)
 Healthcare Services Employees' Union (HSEU)
 National Transport Workers' Union (NTWU)
 Port Officers' Union (POU)
 Reuters Local Employees' Union, Singapore (RLEU)
 Singapore Airport Terminal Services Workers' Union (SATSWU)
 Singapore Bank Employees' Union (SBEU)
 Singapore Bank Officers' Association (SBOA)
 Scoot Tigerair Staff Union (STSU)
 SIA Engineering Company Engineers and Executives Union (SEEU)
 Singapore Airlines Staff Union (SIASU)
 Singapore Insurance Employees' Union (SIEU)
 Singapore Maritime Officers' Union (SMOU)
 Singapore Organisation of Seamen (SOS)
 Singapore Port Workers Union (SPWU)
 Singapore Stevedores Union (SSU)
 Singapore Technologies Electronics Employees' Union (STEEU)
 Singapore Union of Broadcasting Employees (SUBE)
 Staff Union of NTUC-ARU (SUN)
 Times Publishing Group Employees' Union (TPGEU)
 Union of Power and Gas Employees (UPAGE)
 Union of Security Employees (USE)
Union of Tripartite Alliance (UTAL)
 Union of Telecoms Employees of Singapore (UTES)

Public Sector Unions 
 Amalgamated Union of Public Daily Rated Workers (AUPDRW)
 Amalgamated Union of Public Employees (AUPE)
 Amalgamated Union of Statutory Board Employees (AUSBE)
 Housing and Development Board Staff Union (HDBSU)
 Inland Revenue Authority of Singapore Staff Union (IRASSU)
 Ngee Ann Polytechnic Academic Staff Union (NPASU)
 Public Utilities Board Employees' Union (PUBEU)
 Singapore Chinese Teachers' Union (SCTU)
 Singapore Interpreters' and Translators' Union (SITU)
 Singapore Malay Teachers' Union (SMTU)
 SPRING Singapore Staff Union (SSSU)
 Singapore Tamil Teachers' Union (STTU)
 Singapore Teachers' Union (STU)
 Singapore Urban Redevelopment Authority Workers' Union (SURAWU)
 Union of ITE Training Staff (UITS)

Omnibus Unions 
 Singapore Industrial & Services Employees' Union (SISEU)
 The Singapore Manual & Mercantile Workers' Union (SMMWU)

Associations 
 National Taxi Association (NTA)
 National Private Hire Vehicles Association (NPHVA)
 National Instructors and Coaches Association (NICA)
 Singapore FinTech Association (SFA)
 Tech Talent Assembly (TTAB)

NTUC Social Enterprises
The objectives of NTUC Social Enterprises are:
 to help stabilize prices of basic commodities and services
 to strengthen and protect the purchasing power of workers
 to allow union leaders to gain management experience, and to understand the problems faced by management, thus helping to promote better labour-management relations

NTUC Enterprise is the holding entity and single largest shareholder of the NTUC social enterprises.

The list of social enterprises includes:
 Kopitiam (company)
 Mercatus Co-operative
 MoneyOwl
 NTUC FairPrice
 NTUC First Campus
 NTUC Foodfare
 NTUC Health
 Income Insurance
 NTUC LearningHub
 NTUC Link

Related Organizations
The list of related organizations includes:
 Singapore Labour Foundation (SLF)
 Ong Teng Cheong Labour Leadership Institute (OTC Institute)
 e2i, Employment & Employability Institute
 Consumers Association of Singapore (CASE)
 Centre for Domestic Employees
 Migrant Workers' Centre

Additionally, the NTUC has an Administration and Research Unit (ARU) to carry out work related to and supporting Industrial Relations. Within the ARU, the Secretary-General functions as the Director-General. The Director-General is assisted by Divisional Directors, each of whom is in charge of a cluster of departments.

Professional Guilds
32 professional guilds in 22 sectors are partners of the National Trades Union Congress and are classified as U Associates. These U Associates have more than 200,000 members.

 CPA Australia
 Singapore Association of Administrative Professionals (SAAP)
 Singapore Institute of Building Limited (SIBL)
 Singapore Institute of Landscape Architects (SILA)
 LASALLE College of the Arts
 Association of Consulting Engineers Singapore (ACES)
 Institute of Electrical and Electronics Engineers (IEEE)
 The Institution of Engineers, Singapore (IES)
 Action Community for Entrepreneurship (ACE)
 Financial Planning Association of Singapore (FPAS)
 Singapore Insurance Employees’ Union (SIEU) – Insurance and Financial Practitioners Association of Singapore (IFPAS)
 Association of Psychotherapists and Counsellors (Singapore) [APACS]
 Singapore Human Resource Institute (SHRI)
 Human Capital Singapore (HCS)
 Singapore Computer Society (SCS)
 Information Systems Audit and Control Association (ISACA)
 Singapore Corporate Counsel Association (SCCA)
 Direct Marketing Association of Singapore (DMAS)
 Institute of Advertising Singapore (IAS)
 Adam Khoo Learning Technologies Group (AKLTG)
 Financial IT Academy @ SMU (SMU-FITA)
 Project Management Institute, Singapore Chapter (SPMI)
 Industrial & Services Employees’ Union (SISEU) - Institute of Estate Agents, Singapore (IEA)
 PropertyGuru Pte Ltd (PG)
 Singapore Industrial & Services Employees’ Union (SISEU) - Singapore Estate Agents Association (SEAA)
 Singapore Institution of Safety Officers (SISO)
 Singapore Sales Professional Association (SSPA)
 Singapore's Cybersports & Online Gaming Association (SCOGA)
 Singapore Professional Golfers’ Association (SPGA)
 Sustainable Energy Association of Singapore (SEAS)
 The Chartered Institute of Procurement and Supply (CIPS)
 Supply Chain Asia (SCA)

SME Partners
U SME, a department within NTUC ARU, has signed 42 Memoranda of Understanding (MOUs), covering 3,099 SMEs and 70,640 workers. The MOUs help SMEs establish good employment practices and allow them to leverage on NTUC services to learn more about business developments.

U SME conducts workshops to educate SME bosses on topics like the Employment Act, Employment of Foreign Manpower Act and Workplace Safety and Health Act.

Young NTUC
Established in 2005, Young NTUC is the youth wing of Singapore's National Trades Union Congress. Aimed at attracting younger workers into unions, Young NTUC is part of the organisation's efforts to project a more vibrant, modern and youthful image and, at the same time, remain relevant and representative of the workforce.

With a base of about 150,000 young members, Young NTUC is, by far, the largest youth movement in Singapore, as compared to Young PAP and the People's Association's Youth Network. It enables younger members and unionists to participate and be actively involved in the various levels and activities of the labour movement, sharing ideas, views and concerns with their peers, as well as senior leaders of NTUC and affiliated unions.

The movement's signature events include RUN350, a green movement aimed at reducing the  levels in the atmosphere.

See also
Labour movement of Singapore

References

Sources

External links
 Official website

Labour movement in Singapore
Trade unions in Singapore
National federations of trade unions
ICFTU Asia and Pacific Regional Organisation
Trade unions established in 1961
1961 establishments in Singapore